Sing! China (formerly ) is a Chinese singing competition television series broadcast on Zhejiang Television. It premiered during the summer on 15 July 2016. It is a re-branded version of The Voice of China, a show based on the original The Voice of Holland. It has aired six seasons and aims to find new singing talent (solo or duets, professional and amateur) contested by aspiring singers drawn from public auditions.

The winner is determined by live audience voting by SMS text. They receive a record deal with various labels for winning the competition. Winners of the past six seasons have been: Jiang Dunhao (蒋敦豪), Tashi Phuntsok (扎西平措), Tenzin Nyima (旦增尼玛), Xing Hanming (邢晗铭), Shan Yichun (单依纯) and Wu Keyue (伍珂玥).

The series employs a panel of four coaches who critique the artists' performances and guide their teams of selected artists through the remainder of the season. They also compete to ensure that their act wins the competition, thus making them the winning coach. The original panel featured Jay Chou, Na Ying, Wang Feng, and Harlem Yu; the panel for the seventh season features Li Ronghao, Hacken Lee, Liao Changyong, and Fish Leong. Other coaches from previous seasons include Eason Chan, Liu Huan, Nicholas Tse, Li Jian, Wang Leehom and Chris Li.

On 13 July 2022, it was confirmed that Hacken Lee, Liao Changyong and Li Ronghao will be returning as coaches for Season 7. Fish Leong was confirmed as a new coach.

Format
The series consists of three main phases: a blind audition, a battle phase, and live performance shows. The four judges/coaches choose teams of contestants through a blind audition process. Each judge has the length of the auditioner's performance to decide if he or she wants that singer on his or her team. If two or more judges want the same singer (as happens frequently), the singer has the final choice of coach. Since 2018, artists that are not selected by any of the coaches leave the stage directly after their song and do not talk with the coaches. The chairs do not turn and hence the coaches do not see any artists that are not picked. Exceptions include if a coach wants to see the unchosen artist after their performance by request.

Each team of singers is mentored and developed by its respective coach. In the second stage, originally called the battle phase, coaches have two of their team members battle against each other directly by singing the same song together, with the coach choosing which team member to advance from each of the individual "battles". However, from Season 5 onwards, the second stage consists of a cross battle phase, which is similar to the regular battle phase, except for the fact that two artists who are not from the same team battle against each other. Winning artists score a point for their team. The losing artists do not earn any points but are not immediately eliminated. At the end of the cross battle rounds, whichever team that achieved a lower score will have to eliminate one artist from their team as a penalty. Other artists advance to the cross knockout rounds. Cross Knockout rounds are similar to the cross battle rounds except that losing artists are immediately eliminated. Winning artists move on to the first live rounds. Within that first live round, the surviving four acts from each team again compete head-to-head, with public votes determining the best of four acts from each team that will advance to the final eight, while the coach chooses which of the remaining three acts comprises the other performer remaining on the team.

In the final phase, the remaining contestants compete against each other in live broadcasts. The audience and the coaches have equal say in deciding who moves on to the final 4 phase. With one contestant remaining for each coach, the four contestants will compete against each other in the final round with the outcome decided solely by public vote.

Initially, there were no steals/saves in the entire competition. However, since season 5, any artist eliminated during the sing-offs by their coach can be stolen/saved by other coaches.

Coaches and hosts

Coaches

Notes

  In Season 6, Momo Wu, Jike Junyi, Zhang Bichen and Huang Xiaoyun took responsibility as advisors to their respective coaches.
  In Season 7, Huang Xiaoyun and Curley G took responsibility as "Comeback Stage" coaches.

 Legend
 Featured as a full-time coach.
 Featured as a part-time coach.
 Featured as a full-time assistant coach.

Hosts

 Legend
 Featured as a full time host.
 Featured as a backstage host.
 Featured as a part time host.

Dream coaches (as Coaches' advisors)

Singing-accompanying guests

Coaches' teams

 Winning coach; winners are denoted by boldface.
 Runner-up 
 Third Place
 Fourth Place

Remaining finalists are italicized. Stolen artists are underlined.

Series overview

References

External links 
 

2016 Chinese television series debuts
Chinese reality television series
Chinese music television series
Chinese-language television shows
Zhejiang Television original programming